The 2007 Washington Huskies football team represented the University of Washington in the  2007 NCAA Division I FBS football season. The team's head coach was Tyrone Willingham. It played its home games at Husky Stadium in Seattle, Washington, USA.

The 2007 Huskies' schedule was ranked as the most difficult in college football by Jeff Sagarin. The Huskies finished with a record of 4–9, their fourth straight losing season. This, combined with the 2007 team having the worst defense in school history, led to the firings of defensive coordinator Kent Baer and special teams coach Bob Simmons at the end of the season.

The Huskies were led by their redshirt freshman quarterback Jake Locker, who made his debut this season, throwing for over 2,000 yards and rushing for 986. Locker accounted for 27 touchdowns. Louis Rankin, who was named the team's offensive most valuable player, rushed for 1,294 yards.

Schedule

Personnel

NFL Draft
No Huskies were selected in the 2008 NFL Draft, which lasted seven rounds (252 selections).

References

Washington
Washington Huskies football seasons
Washington Huskies football